Maanikyan is a 2005 Indian Malayalam film, directed by K. K. Haridas. The film stars Kalabhavan Mani, Nandini, Jagathy Sreekumar and Siddique in lead roles. The film had musical score by Thej Mervin.

Cast
 
Kalabhavan Mani as Maanikyan
Nandini as Nirmala Menon
Jagathy Sreekumar as Shankaran
Siddique as Gopikrishnan
Kaviraj as  Jayaprakash
Saranya Sasi as Chandralekha
Salim Kumar as Kumaran
Sruthi Lakshmi as Young  Nirmala Menon
Suresh Krishna as Rajedran
Manka Mahesh as Vilasiniyamma
Rizabawa as Shekhara Menon
Bindu Panicker as Gowri
Gayathri as Thulasi
Aniyappan
Geetha Salam 
Lakshmi Krishnamoorthy 
Sagar Shiyas 
Spadikam George 
Guinness Pakru as Cameo Appearance
Balachandran Chullikkadu as Cameo Appearance
Subbalakshmi as Ammumma

Soundtrack
The music was composed by Thej Mervin.

References

2005 films
2000s Malayalam-language films
Films directed by K. K. Haridas